Bilczew refers to the following places in Poland:

 Bilczew, Konin County
 Bilczew, Ostrów Wielkopolski County